Linda Larason (July 5, 1947 – April 11, 2020) was an American politician who served in the Oklahoma House of Representatives from the 88th district from 1984 to 1994.

She died of multiple myeloma on April 11, 2020, in Oklahoma City, Oklahoma at age 72.

References

1947 births
2020 deaths
Democratic Party members of the Oklahoma House of Representatives